The On-line Guitar Archive (OLGA) was the first Internet library of guitar and bass tablature, or "tabs". Born from a collection of guitarist internet-forum archives, it was a useful resource for musicians of all genres for over a decade.

History
The website began its life in the newsgroups rec.music.makers.guitar.tablature and alt.guitar.tab, where users would post tabs they had written or requests for tabs of certain songs or artists. The problem was that after a few days, the contents of the forum would be aged (i.e. removed). Around 1992 the posts were collected together by James Bender at UNLV into an ftp site that later became www.OLGA.net. In 1994 Cathal Woods took over the project as archivist.

In 1996, EMI Publishing filed a complaint with UNLV, claiming that the archive was in breach of copyright law with songs they had the rights to. Although OLGA was never threatened directly, UNLV kicked the project off its server. Then in 1998, after a new home for the site was found, OLGA received a similar copyright complaint from the Harry Fox Agency (HFA). As a result, OLGA was forced to shut down, re-emerging later as OLGA incorporated, a registered non-profit organization dedicated to preserving the archive and providing for its bandwidth. The site prior to this final move was preserved as "the old archive," and contributions since the move were stored in "the new archive".

In June 2006 they received a take down letter from lawyers representing the NMPA and the MPA, although by this time temporary clones of the archive had started to appear on sites such as Renegade Olga.

On March 27, 2007, HFA announced a licensing agreement with Musicnotes which "authorize[d] a newly launched Musicnotes guitar tab download website that utilizes the copyrighted music of HFA’s participating music publishers on a commission free basis." Though the announcement did not specifically mention where this site would be available, the contact information for the Musicnotes representative also mentioned MXTabs.net.

Musicnotes is an internet-based sheet music retailer and publisher, offering over 400,000 pieces of digital sheet music and guitar tablature.

Contributions
To be a candidate for the archive, a file was required to be the author's own work (i.e., interpretation of how to play the song) and cannot have been derived from a published music book, otherwise inclusion in OLGA would have constituted a copyright violation.

Current status
In 2006, the Archive removed all 34,000 tablatures on the site. A note posted on the site indicated that those running the site had received "a 'take down' letter from lawyers representing the National Music Publishers Association and the Music Publishers Association", according to the linked letter on the front page. In the letter it is stated that OLGA "makes available tablature versions of copyrighted musical compositions owned or controlled by members of the NMPA and MPA" 

Although originally a notice on the site suggested that the shutdown would only be temporary while OLGA attempted to resolve legal issues, the long time archivist for the site has indicated that the situation is permanent.  On a personal web site he stated, "For twelve years I ran OLGA - the On-Line Guitar Archive. RIP."

As of October 2019, the site appears to have been taken offline.

See also
 Guitar
 Sheet music
 Music notation
 Mxtabs

References

Musical notation
Guitar websites
American music websites